Aspergillus paleaceus (also named Neosartorya stramenia) is a species of fungus in the genus Aspergillus. It is from the Fumigati section. The species was first described in 1985. It has been reported to produce quinolactacin and avenaciolide.

Growth and morphology

A. paleaceus has been cultivated on both Czapek yeast extract agar (CYA) plates and Malt Extract Agar Oxoid® (MEAOX) plates. The growth morphology of the colonies can be seen in the pictures below.

References 

paleaceus
Fungi described in 1985